Anthony James "Tony" Naldrett, FRSC (1933 – 21 June 2020) was an English and Canadian geologist. He was an authority on the geology and origin of nickel-copper-platinum group element deposits, the tectonic setting in which they occur, the petrology of associated rocks, and controls on their composition. He was an expert on the reaction between sulfide and silicate melts, fractional crystallization of sulfide melts, and the role of hydrothermal fluids.

Early life
Naldrett was born in England. Between 1951 and 1953, he was a pilot in the Royal Air Force.

In 1957, he obtained a degree in geology from the University of Cambridge. Later that year he moved to Canada, where he worked in Sudbury as a geologist for Falconbridge Nickel Mines. In 1959 he moved to Kingston, Ontario to attend Queen's University. He received an MSc (1961) and a PhD degree (1964) for his research on nickel deposits.

Career
Naldrett took a position working in the Geophysical Laboratory of the Carnegie Institution of Washington. In 1967, he returned to Canada as an assistant professor at the University of Toronto. In 1972, he was appointed a full Professor, and University Professor in 1984. He worked there until his retirement in 1998. The university made him an Emeritus Professor.

Naldrett authored or co-authored 254 refereed publications, plus wrote or edited eight books covering his research in geology, mineralogy and chemistry of magmatic sulfide deposits and related rocks. His research covered most of the world's magmatic sulfide ores, including those at Sudbury, the Abitibi Belt, Voisey's Bay, the West Australian Widgiemooltha Komatiite deposits, the Zimbabwe Nickel deposits, deposits of the Raglan and Thompson belts, Norilsk, Pechenga, Jinchuan, the Duluth Complex, the Bushveld and Stillwater complexes, Zimbabwe's Great Dyke, and at the Lac des Îles igneous complex of northwestern Ontario.

In addition to his research, he consulted for over 35 companies including Chevron Corporation, Falconbridge, Western Mining Corporation, BHP, Rio Tinto, Cominco-American, Voisey's Bay Nickel, and Kennecott.

Positions held
 1982–1983, President of the Mineralogical Association of Canada
 1991–1992, President of the Society of Economic Geologists
 1998–2002, President of the International Mineralogical Association
 2001–2002, President of the Geological Society of America
 1987–1992, Chairman of the Board of the International Geological Correlation Programme
 2005–2009, Visiting Professor at Royal Holloway, University of London
 2005–2020; Honorary Professorship at the University of the Witwatersrand
 2009–2020; Honorary Research Fellow, Natural History Museum, London

Honours and awards
1974, awarded the Barlow Memorial Medal by the Canadian Institute of Mining and Metallurgy
1980, awarded the Duncan Derry Medal by the Geological Association of Canada
1982, awarded the Society Medal by the Society of Economic Geologists
1983, bestowed an Honorary Life Fellowship in the European Union of Geosciences
1984, elected to the Fellowship in the Royal Society of Canada
1986, awarded the Bownocker Gold Medal by Ohio State University
1991, awarded the Past-Presidents' Medal by the Mineralogical Association of Canada
1994, awarded the Logan Medal by the Geological Association of Canada
1999, bestowed an Honorary Life Fellowship in the Russian Mineralogical Society
2000, awarded the Wardell Armstrong Prize from the Institution of Mining and Metallurgy
2000, received D.Sc. (honoris causa) from Laurentian University
2001, received D.Sc. (honoris causa) from the University of Pretoria
2002, bestowed an Honorary Life Fellowship in the Mineralogical Society
2002, awarded the Penrose Gold Medal by the Society of Economic Geologists
2008, elected the 30th de Beers Alex du Toit Memorial Lecturer by the Geological Society of South Africa
2011, bestowed Honorary Life Fellow, Geological Society of South Africa
2012, awarded the Haddon Forrester King medal by the Australian Academy of Science
2013, creation of the Naldrett graduate scholarship, Department of Earth Sciences, University of Toronto

Frequently cited publications
2004 Naldrett, A.J., Magmatic Sulfide Deposits: Geology, Geochemistry and Exploration, Springer Verlaag, 728 pp
2003 Naldrett, A.J., Magmatic Sulfide Deposits of Nickel-Copper and Platinum Metal Ores, St Petersburg University 400 pp (in Russian)
2001 Li, C., Naldrett, A.J. and Ripley, E.M., Critical factors for the formation of a Ni-Cu deposit: Lessons from a comparison of the Pants Lake and Voisey's Bay deposits, Labrador, Mineralium Deposita 36, 85–92.
2000 Li, Chusi and Naldrett, Anthony J., Melting reactions of gneissic inclusions with enclosing magma at Voisey's Bay: Implications with respect to ore genesis. Economic Geology, 95, 801-814

References
University of Toronto- Bio
Precambrian Research Center- Bio
Naldrett Will Deliver Convocation Address
 Geology Alumni News- February 2006

External links
Society of Economic Geologists- Penrose Award

See also
Ore genesis
Kambalda type komatiitic nickel ore deposits

British geologists
Royal Air Force officers
Canadian geologists
English emigrants to Canada
Fellows of the Royal Society of Canada
Queen's University at Kingston alumni
Academic staff of the University of Toronto
1933 births
2020 deaths
Alumni of the University of Cambridge
Economic geologists
Logan Medal recipients
Presidents of the Geological Society of America
Presidents of the International Mineralogical Association